Gypsies is an album by Argentine composer, pianist and conductor Lalo Schifrin recorded in 1978 and released on the Tabu label.

Track listing
All compositions by Lalo Schifrin
 "To Cast a Spell" - 5:40
 "King of Hearts" - 5:14
 "Moonlight Gypsies" - 4:57
 "Fortune Tellers" - 4:40
 "Gauchos" - 5:34
 "Pampas" - 5:32
 "Prophecy of Love" - 3:39
 "Ring Around the Moon" - 5:23

Personnel
Lalo Schifrin - piano, keyboards, synthesizer, arranger, conductor
Oscar Brashear, Bobby Bryant - trumpet
Charles Loper, Lew McCreary - trombone
Anthony Ortega, Ernie Watts, Don Menza - woodwinds
Mike Melvoin - keyboards
Ian Underwood - synthesizer
Dean Parks - guitar
Abraham Laboriel - electric bass
Jim Keltner - drums
Emil Richards, Paulinho Da Costa - percussion

References

Tabu Records albums
Lalo Schifrin albums
1978 albums
Albums arranged by Lalo Schifrin
Albums conducted by Lalo Schifrin
Instrumental albums